The IHF Men's Youth World Championship is the official competition for men's national handball teams under-19, has been organized by the International Handball Federation since 2005. It takes place every two years in odd years.

Tournaments

Medal table

Participating nations

References

External links
ihf.info

 
Youth
Recurring sporting events established in 2005